Fatqa is a village located in the Keserwan District of the  Keserwan-Jbeil Governorate in Lebanon.

References

Populated places in Keserwan District